The Le Fier class was a series of sea-going torpedo boats built for the French Navy. Laid down in 1940, the ships were incomplete as of the fall of France and remained unfinished for the rest of World War II.

Design and development
With rising tensions with Nazi Germany after their remilitarization of the Rhineland in 7 March 1936, the French Third Republic undertook a series of naval construction programmes to maintain military parity in the face of rapid German re-armament. On 31 December 1936, the French Parliament authorized the construction of more warships at the suggestion of Admiral François Darlan. Among them were four torpedo boats (torpilleur). Collectively this order was named Tranche 1937.

The four torpedo boats were to be named, Le Fier, L'Agile, L'Entreprenant, and Le Farouche and were also referred to as torpilleurs légers de 1010 in reference to their displacement in tons. Exactly one year after the 1937 tranche, on 31 December 1937 the chamber of deputies approved a second naval procurement order, named Tranche 1938. Three additional Le Fier-class torpedo boats, to be named Alsacien, Le Corse and Le Breton were ordered. On 2 May 1938, an additional tranche (Tranche 1938bis) was budgeted which included five more Le Fier-class torpedo boats, to be named  Le Tunisien, Le Normand, Le Parisien, Le Provençal and Le Saintongeais. Lastly Tranche 1938ter was approved, with two more torpedo boats, Le Niçois and Le Savoyard. 

The Le Fier class were based on an enlarged  torpedo boat design with improved sea-going features. Ships ordered under Tranche 1937 were to be powered by Rateau-Bretagne turbine engines while all subsequent ships, starting with L'Alsacien were to be powered by Parsons steam turbines. The Le Fier class had an unorthodox weapons arrangement, with all main guns, mounted aft, and anti-aircraft armament primarily mounted at the fore-end. The primary armament of Le Fier class were four, recently developed 100mm/45 Modèle 1933 dual-purpose guns, in two rear-facing 29.8 ton Contre-Avions Double Modèle 1937 gun turrets protected by  plating. The  Modèle 1933 was an improved variant of the earlier Modèle 1930 and were the first dual purpose guns mounted on a French navy ship. The secondary armament consisted of four single Canon de 37 mm Modèle 1925 anti-aircraft guns, and eight Hotchkiss M1929 machine guns in four, twin Contre-Avions Double Modèle 1929 mountings. Torpedo armament consisted of two, centreline double  torpedo tubes.

Of all these French fourteen torpedo boats, none would ever be completed. After the surrender of France on 25 June 1940, all work on the Le Fier-class torpedo boats was halted.

German service

In June 1940, the German army seized all shipyards from the new collaborationist Vichy France government including the Le Fier-class torpedo boats still under construction. These were Le Fier, L'Agile, L'Entreprenant, Le Farouche, L'Alsacien, and Le Corse. Le Breton, which was the least complete of the ships, was scrapped and the seven unbuilt ships were cancelled. The remaining torpedo boats were transferred to the Kriegsmarine and renamed TA1-TA6 (Torpedoboot Ausland) and were to be completed for the Germans with revised specifications.

Displacement would increase to 1087 tons, with a full displacement 1,443 tons. At the same time the dimensions were to shrunk. The ships would be rearmed with German weapons. The four 100 mm dual-purpose guns would be replaced by three, single mounted 10.5 cm SK C/32 naval guns. The secondary guns would consist of two 3.7 cm SK C/30 guns, and nine 2 cm SK c/38 guns. Four in one quad-mount, and five single mounts. The torpedo armament consisted of six centreline  torpedo tubes, in two triple launchers.

While work on the torpedo boats continued under German supervision, a shortage of materials and sabotage by French workers hampered progress of the ships, even though before the surrender several of the ships were near completion. Eventually in April 1943, due to a lack of general progress, it was decided that only TA1 and TA4 would be completed and the rest were to be cannibalized to finish the remaining two ships. Delays continued as TA2 and TA4 were sunk by United States Army Air Forces, but refloated, again. The Normandy landings on 6 June 1944 led to a German withdrawal from Nantes and the remaining ships were purposely scuttled by the Germans or were sunk, incomplete, on 11 August 1944.

The Germans assisted Spain in the design and construction of the Audaz-class destroyers using captured plans and documents from the Le Fier class.

Ships

References

Bibliography

Torpedo boat classes
 
Ship classes of the French Navy